Douar El Ma is a town and commune in Taleb Larbi District, El Oued Province, Algeria, near the border with Tunisia. According to the 2008 census it has a population of 5,543, up from 3,527 in 1998,
 and an annual growth rate of 4.7%. The town is connected by a local road to Taleb Larbi.

Climate 

Douar El Ma has a hot desert climate (Köppen climate classification BWh), with very hot summers and mild winters, and very little precipitation throughout the year.

Education 

1.0% of the population has a tertiary education (the lowest in the province), and another 5.3% has completed secondary education. The overall literacy rate is 45.3%, and is 51.3% among males and 39.2% among females; all three rates are the lowest in the province.

Localities 
The commune of Douar El Ma is composed of four localities:

 Douar El Ma
 Mih Naceur
 Bir Romane
 Bir Djedid

References 

Neighbouring towns and cities

Communes of El Oued Province
El Oued Province